Farnaz Shetty is an Indian actress who primarily works telugu films “.She is known for playing Indu” in Film Induvadana

Early life
Shetty has stated that her mother had wanted her to pursue a career in aviation or acting. She was approached by a casting director in a coffee shop for her first role in Dil Ki Nazar Se Khoobsurat.

Filmography

Television

Films

Web series

References

External links 
 

Actresses from Mumbai
Year of birth missing (living people)
Living people
Actresses in Hindi television
21st-century Indian actresses
Indian film actresses